Ragnar Svensson (31 December 1882 – 5 June 1959) was a Swedish sailor who competed in the 1920 Summer Olympics. He was a crew member of the Swedish boat Elsie, which won the silver medal in the 40 m² class.

References

1882 births
1959 deaths
Swedish male sailors (sport)
Sailors at the 1920 Summer Olympics – 40m2 Skerry cruiser
Olympic sailors of Sweden
Olympic silver medalists for Sweden
Olympic medalists in sailing
Medalists at the 1920 Summer Olympics